The Grammy Award for Record of the Year is presented by the National Academy of Recording Arts and Sciences of the United States to "honor artistic achievement, technical proficiency and overall excellence in the recording industry, without regard to sales or chart position." The Record of the Year award is one of the four "General Field" categories at the awards (alongside Best New Artist, Song of the Year and Album of the Year) presented annually since the 1st Annual Grammy Awards in 1959.

According to the 54th Annual Grammy Awards description guide, the award is presented:

Arrangers, songwriters, musicians and background singers of a winning recording can apply for a Winners Certificate. Songwriters can only apply for a certificate if it is a new song.

Since the 55th Annual Grammy Awards in 2013, mastering engineers are considered nominees and award recipients in this category.

Record of the Year is related to but is conceptually different from Song of the Year or Album of the Year:

 Record of the Year is awarded for a single or for one track from an album. This award goes to the performing artist, the producer, recording engineer and/or mixer for that song. In this sense, "record" means a particular recorded song, not its composition or an album of songs.
 Song of the Year is also awarded for a single or individual track, but the recipient of this award is the songwriter who actually wrote the lyrics and/or melodies to the song. "Song" in this context means the song as composed, not its recording.
 Album of the Year is awarded for a whole album, and the award is presented to the artist, songwriter, producer, recording engineer, and mastering engineer for that album. In this context, "album" means a recorded collection of songs (a multi-track LP, CD, or download package), not the individual songs or their compositions.

History and description
The Record of the Year awards have been awarded since 1959. It is one of the four most prestigious Grammy Awards. Despite both the Song of the Year award and Record of the Year being awarded for a single or for one track from an album, this award goes to the performer and production team of the song whereas the Song of the Year award goes only to the composer(s) of the song. According to the 54th Grammy Awards description guide, the award is given for commercially released singles or tracks of new vocal or instrumental recordings. Tracks from a previous year's album may be entered provided the track was not entered the previous year and provided the album did not win a Grammy Award to the artist(s), producer(s), recording engineer(s) and/or mixer(s) if other than the artist. Associate producers and executive producers are not eligible".

The honorees through its history have been:
1959–1965: Artist only.
1966–1998: Artist and producer.
1999–2012: Artist, producer, recording engineer and mixing engineer
2013–present: Artist, producer, recording engineer, mixing engineer and mastering engineer

The category has expanded to include eight nominees in 2019.

Achievements 

Tom Coyne holds the record for most wins in this category as a mastering engineer at four times (2015, 2016, 2017 and 2018) and was the only person to win the award four consecutive years. Only two artists have won three times: Paul Simon ("Mrs. Robinson" in 1969, "Bridge over Troubled Water" in 1971, both as part of Simon & Garfunkel; and "Graceland" in 1988) and Bruno Mars ("Uptown Funk" in 2016, with Mark Ronson; "24K Magic" in 2018; and "Leave the Door Open" in 2022, as part of Silk Sonic). Four engineers/mixers have won the award three times Tom Elmhirst has won three times as an engineer/mixer (2008, 2012 and 2017), Şerban Ghenea (2016, 2018 and 2022), John Hanes (2016, 2018 and 2022), and Charles Moniz (2016, 2018 and 2022)

Roberta Flack was the first artist to win Record of the Year in two consecutive years: in 1973 ("The First Time Ever I Saw Your Face") and 1974 ("Killing Me Softly with His Song") from two different studio albums. This happened again when U2 won in 2001 ("Beautiful Day") and 2002 ("Walk On"), the only occurrence of an artist winning the award in two consecutive years with records from the same album. Billie Eilish became the first musician ever to complete the feat with recordings from a studio album, as well as a non-album single: in 2020 ("Bad Guy") and 2021 ("Everything I Wanted").

Other artists to receive multiple Grammys for Record of the Year are Henry Mancini ("Moon River" and "Days of Wine and Roses"); Simon & Garfunkel ("Mrs. Robinson" and "Bridge over Troubled Water"); The 5th Dimension ("Up, Up and Away" and "Aquarius/Let the Sunshine In"); Eric Clapton ("Tears in Heaven" and "Change the World"); Norah Jones ("Don't Know Why" and "Here We Go Again"); Adele ("Rolling in the Deep" and "Hello").

Mark Ronson is the only performer to win the award both as the main credit artist and as a record producer, winning as lead artist for his respective song, "Uptown Funk" (featuring Bruno Mars); and as a producer for "Rehab" by Amy Winehouse.

Beyoncé is the most nominated artist for Record of the Year with eight nominations. Beyoncé also has the most Record of the Year nominations among female artists with nods for "Say My Name" as part of Destiny's Child and seven times as a solo act with "Crazy in Love" (featuring Jay-Z), "Irreplaceable", "Halo", "Formation", "Black Parade", "Savage" (with Megan Thee Stallion), and "Break My Soul"; although she has not won it yet. Frank Sinatra holds the record for most nominations as a male artist with nominations for "Witchcraft", "High Hopes", "Nice 'n' Easy", "The Second Time Around", "Somethin' Stupid" (with Nancy Sinatra), and "Theme from New York, New York"; he received this accolade once in 1967, with "Strangers in the Night".  The Beatles have the most Record of the Year nominations as a group, with four nominations: "I Want to Hold Your Hand", "Yesterday", "Hey Jude", and "Let It Be"; but never won the award.

The first woman to win the award was Astrud Gilberto in 1965, for "The Girl from Ipanema" (with Stan Getz). Roberta Flack was the first female artist to win the award twice. Flack, Norah Jones, Adele, and Billie Eilish are the only women to win the award more than once for their recordings, winning for "The First Time Ever I Saw Your Face" and "Killing Me Softly with His Song"; and "Don't Know Why" and "Here We Go Again" (with Ray Charles); and "Rolling in the Deep" and "Hello"; and "Bad Guy" and "Everything I Wanted", respectively (Flack was also nominated for "Feel Like Makin' Love"; Adele nominated for "Chasing Pavements"; and Eilish nominated for "Happier Than Ever"). Additionally, both Florence LaRue and Marilyn McCoo also receive this accolade twice as part of The 5th Dimension, for "Up, Up and Away" and "Aquarius/Let the Sunshine In".

At 17 years old, Lorde became the youngest main artist to be nominated for "Royals" in 2014, with Billie Eilish becoming the youngest winner at 18 years old for "Bad Guy" in 2020.

Christopher Cross and Billie Eilish are the only artists to receive Grammys for Record of the Year as well as Album of the Year, Song of the Year, and Best New Artist in a single ceremony. Adele was the first artist to win the award for Record of the Year, Album of the Year, Song of the Year, and Best New Artist from separate occasions, and first woman to accomplish this feat. Only seven artists took the Record of the Year and Best New Artist awards during the same ceremony: Bobby Darin ("Mack the Knife" in 1960), Christopher Cross ("Sailing" in 1981), Sheryl Crow ("All I Wanna Do" in 1995), Norah Jones ("Don't Know Why" in 2003), Amy Winehouse ("Rehab" in 2008), Sam Smith ("Stay with Me (Darkchild Version)" in 2015) and Billie Eilish ("Bad Guy" in 2020).

Frank Sinatra, Roberta Flack, Steve Winwood, Post Malone, Billie Eilish, and Doja Cat are the only artists to receive three consecutive nominations for Record of the Year. Additionally, Sinatra holds the record for most consecutive years being nominated for Record of the Year, with four.

The person to appear on the most consecutive Records of the Year was Hal Blaine, the prolific studio drummer who played on six consecutive winners from 1966 to 1971: "A Taste of Honey", "Strangers in the Night", "Up, Up and Away", "Mrs. Robinson", "Aquarius/Let the Sunshine In", and "Bridge Over Troubled Water".

Thirty-two of the winning songs have also won the award for Song of the Year.

Process
From 1995 to 2021, members of the National Academy of Recording Arts and Sciences nominated their choices for record of the year. A list of the top twenty records was given to the Nominations Review Committee, a specially selected group of anonymous members, who then selected the top five records to gain a nomination in the category in a special ballot. The rest of the members then voted on a winner from the five nominees. In 2018, it was announced the number of nominated tracks will be increased to eight. In 2021, it was announced that the Nomination Review Committees would be disbanded, and the final nominees for record of the year would be decided by votes from members. Starting in 2022, the number of nominees in the category increased to 10.

Recipients

1950s

1960s

1970s

1980s

1990s

2000s

2010s

2020s

 Each year is linked to the article about the Grammy Awards held that year.

References

General
  Note: User must select the "General" category as the genre under the search feature.
Specific

External links
 

Record Of The Year